Alqchin or Alqechin or Elqechin may refer to:
 Alqchin-e Olya
 Alqchin-e Sofla
 Alqchin Rural District